Lake Michigan College is a public community college in Berrien County, Michigan. The main campus is in Benton Township, Michigan with regional campuses in Niles and South Haven. The Welch Center for Wine & Viticulture opened on the main campus in 2019.

History
Lake Michigan College was founded as Benton Harbor Junior College in 1946 within the city of Benton Harbor when voters approved an initiative to create a junior college. In 1954, Benton Harbor Junior College was redesigned into the Benton Harbor Community College and Technical Institute (CCTI). In 1963, a vote in Berrien County was held and affirmed to plan to create a county college district. A tax of up to one mill was approved for operation and building needs and a six-person board of trustees was established as the governing body of the college. CCTI was renamed again in 1964 to Lake Michigan College. Construction on the Napier Avenue Campus, which is now the main campus, began in 1965 when the board of trustees approved the purchase of a  parcel of land in Benton Township.

Campuses
The college operates between three campuses: the main campus, located off Napier Avenue in Benton Harbor, the Niles Campus at Bertrand Crossing, and the South Haven campus.  Classes are also offered at several off-campus locations and online.  While primarily a commuter campus throughout its history, LMC began construction of the college's first on-campus residence hall, Beckwith Hall, at the Napier Avenue campus in the summer of 2013 and was occupied by its first residents in the fall of 2014. A Siena Heights University satellite campus  is housed at the Benton Harbor campus, although Western Michigan University has transferred ownership of the building which housed its Southwest extension over to Lake Michigan College; this building is now known as the Todd Center, and houses the Business, Computer Science and Education departments as of Fall 2018. The South Haven campus was completed in 2003 after South Haven School District residents voted to join the Lake Michigan College district, the M-TEC training facility was completed in 2000 and the Bertrand Crossing campus in 1998. After a proposed millage failed, the board of trustees put the M-TEC facility up for sale in 2008.
In January 2015, Lake Michigan College sold the 44,000 square foot M-TEC building to the Whirlpool Corporation. Programs previously housed at the M-TEC facility were relocated to the Hanson Technology Center, which opened to the public at Lake Michigan College's Napier Avenue Campus in the fall of 2016. The campus consolidations should save Lake Michigan College money through operational efficiencies.

Athletics

Lake Michigan College is a member of the NJCAA Region 12 and the MCCAA Western Division.  The college's athletic teams were known as the "Indians" from 1946 until 2012, representing the school's historic connection to the Pokagon Band of Potawatomi Indians of Southwest Michigan.  In February 2012, after several college staff and student meetings with the Pokagon Tribal Council, it was announced that the school would adopt a new team nickname in an effort put forward by student leaders to increase school spirit and mascot visibility while still honoring the historical connection to the Pokagon.  On April 24, 2012, the college officially announced "Red Hawks" as its new team name for all sports, inspired by the red-tailed hawk which appears on the flag of the Pokagon Nation.

Former Women's Basketball Head Coach, Jason Cooper, led the LMC Women's Basketball team for ten years, compiling a 247–71 win–loss record, including six visits to the NJCAA National Tournament in eight years.  The team finished the 2011–2012 season as the #2 ranked team in the country.  The LMC women are eighth in total NJCAA appearances, the most of any MCCAA team.  The men's basketball team placed 7th in the nation in 2005, and Doug Schaffer, former Athletic Director and Men's Basketball Head Coach, was named Michigan Community College Athletic Association Athletic Director of the Year for 2005.  Lake Michigan College also has baseball, softball, volleyball, and men's and women's soccer teams as well as club sports.The Lake Michigan College Cheer Team has performed consistently well in Universal Cheerleading Association events, earning numerous awards, most recently two consecutive Leadership Awards in 2012 and 2013.  LMC's mascot, Rocky the Red Hawk, has become a popular part of all sporting events and college activities since his debut in 2012.  The biggest rivals of Lake Michigan College are the Kalamazoo Valley Community College Cougars and the Ancilla College Chargers.

Notable alumni 
Eric Thompson, Maureen Bauer, Duane Below, Chokwe Pitchford are all notable alumni of Lake Michigan College. Eric Thompson is an American professional basketball player for CSO Voluntari of the Liga Națională. Maureen Bauer is an American politician serving as a member of the Indiana House of Representatives from the 6th district. Duane Arthur Below is an American professional baseball pitcher who is a free agent. He has played in Major League Baseball for the Miami Marlins and Detroit Tigers. Chokwe Pitchford (Democratic Party) ran for election to the Michigan House of Representatives to represent District 79. He lost in the general election on November 3, 2020.

References

External links
 Official website

Educational institutions established in 1946
Two-year colleges in the United States
Community colleges in Michigan
Michigan Community College Athletic Association
Education in Berrien County, Michigan
Education in Van Buren County, Michigan
1946 establishments in Michigan
NJCAA athletics